Saltoun railway station served the villages of East Saltoun and West Saltoun in East Lothian, Scotland, from 1901 to 1933 on the Macmerry Branch.

History 
The station was opened on 14 October 1901 by the North British Railway. By the level crossing was the station building and to the west was the goods yard, which had two sidings and a loading bank. The yard carried whisky bottles from the nearby Glenkinchie distillery. It also had a signal box from 1901 to 1956. The station closed on 3 April 1933.

References 

Disused railway stations in East Lothian
Former North British Railway stations
Railway stations in Great Britain opened in 1901
Railway stations in Great Britain closed in 1933
1901 establishments in Scotland
1933 disestablishments in Scotland